The Bjelke-Petersen Ministry was a ministry of the Government of Queensland and was led by Premier Joh Bjelke-Petersen, who led the Country Party and its successor, the National Party. It succeeded the Chalk Ministry on 8 August 1968 as part of a series of events following the death of former Premier Jack Pizzey on 31 July. It was succeeded by the Ahern Ministry on 1 December 1987 following Bjelke-Petersen's resignation as Premier.

All lists below are ordered by decreasing seniority within the Cabinet, as indicated by the Government Gazette and the Hansard index. Blue entries indicate members of the Liberal Party, while non-shaded entries indicate members of the Country or National Party.

First ministry
The first Bjelke-Petersen ministry was sworn in by Governor Alan Mansfield on 8 August 1968, and served until the reconstitution of the Ministry on 29 May 1969. It was almost unchanged from the Pizzey Ministry and Chalk Ministry. Max Hodges was appointed to fill the cabinet vacancy caused by Jack Pizzey's death, and the roles vacated by Bjelke-Petersen on becoming Premier.

Second ministry
On 29 May 1969, following the 1969 election on 17 May, the Ministry was reconstituted by the Administrator, William Mack, due to the Governor's absence, and served until the next reconstitution of the ministry on 20 June 1972. There were almost no changes—Harold Richter retired from politics, and Nev Hewitt was appointed to the resulting cabinet vacancy. On 4 September 1969, the cabinet was expanded from 13 to 14 members, and Wally Rae was appointed.

On 19 December 1971, Peter Delamothe, the Attorney-General and Minister for Justice, resigned to take up an appointment as Agent-General of Queensland. His position in the ministry was left vacant for the remainder of the term, while William Knox was appointed to his former roles.

Third ministry
On 20 June 1972, following the 1972 election on 27 May, the Ministry was reconstituted by the Governor, Sir Colin Hannah, and served until the next reconstitution of the ministry on 23 December 1974. John Row retired from Parliament, and a further cabinet vacancy existed due to Delamothe's departure in December 1971. Keith Hooper and Henry McKechnie were appointed to fill the vacancies.

Fourth ministry
On 23 December 1974, following the 1974 election on 7 December, the Ministry was reconstituted, and served until a reshuffle on 13 August 1976. Sir Alan Fletcher and Douglas Tooth retired from politics and left the ministry, while Wally Rae was appointed Agent-General of Queensland on 6 December. They were replaced by Tom Newbery, Ken Tomkins and Llew Edwards.

On 10 March 1975, the ministry grew from 14 to 18 offices.

Reconstitution

On 13 August 1976, Deputy Premier and Liberal leader Sir Gordon Chalk resigned, resulting in a reshuffle. William Knox replaced Chalk in his roles, while John Greenwood was appointed to the vacant position in the ministry.

Keith Hooper, Minister for Transport and Liberal member for Greenslopes, died on 23 August 1977. Fred Campbell added Transport to his roles for the remainder of the parliamentary term.

Fifth Ministry
On 16 December 1977, following the 1977 election on 12 November, the Ministry was reconstituted. Due to the death of Keith Hooper on 23 August 1977, there was a vacancy in the outgoing ministry, to which Charles Porter was appointed.

A number of minor changes occurred:
 John Herbert resigned from Parliament on 13 September 1978 due to terminally ill health. Sam Doumany was appointed to replace him in the cabinet and as Minister for Welfare on 2 October 1978.
 On 9 October 1978, Llew Edwards replaced William Knox as leader of the Liberal Party and hence Deputy Premier of Queensland. On 15 December 1978, they swapped portfolios, with Knox becoming Minister for Health and Edwards becoming Treasurer.
 On 31 July 1979, Max Hodges resigned from Parliament, and on 21 August 1978, Tom Newbery resigned from the ministry. Max Hooper and Ivan Gibbs were appointed to replace them in cabinet and in their roles on 24 August 1978.
 On 17 August 1980, Ron Camm resigned from Parliament to become chairman of the Sugar Board. Russ Hinze and Vic Sullivan added his cabinet roles to their responsibilities, while Mike Ahern was appointed to the cabinet vacancy.

Sixth Ministry

Seventh Ministry

Eighth Ministry
On 1 December 1986, following the 1986 election on 1 November, the Ministry was reconstituted by the Governor, Walter Campbell, and served until the Ahern Ministry was sworn in on 1 December 1987. Neil Turner left Parliament, and Paul Clauson was appointed to the resulting cabinet vacancy. As with the Seventh Ministry, all cabinet members were members of the National Party.

On 25 November 1987, Bjelke-Petersen dismissed three ministers and appointed replacements. The following day, a meeting of 48 of the 49 National members was convened, and a spill motion was carried 39-8, after which a ballot was held for the leadership, which was won by Mike Ahern. Ahern phoned the Governor and arranged to forward a document signed by 47 members to Government House supporting his leadership. On 1 December, after significant pressure and realising his position, Bjelke-Petersen resigned, and an hour later, all ministers' commissions were terminated and a two-man Ahern Ministry was sworn in.

References

 

Queensland ministries